The General Jewish Labour Party (Algemeyne Yidishe Arbets-Partei, abbreviated A.Y.A.P, abbreviated OŻPP) was a Jewish socialist political party in Poland. The party was founded in Lviv in November 1931 by a leftwing group of the General Jewish Labour Bund in Poland in East Galicia, which upheld the idea of dictatorship of the proletariat, a faction of the Poale Zion Left and young left-wing Zionists. The party was aligned with the Communist Party of Poland. The party called for a workers' government, equality for Jewish working people, education in Yiddish language for Jewish children in state schools, abolition of discrimination in the labour market and to struggle against anti-semitism.

The party was led by Zigmunt Stein.

The party was banned by the Ministry of Interior on July 16, 1934, a move welcomed by mainstream Jewish leaders in East Galicia. Several activists of the party were imprisoned for being members of the party. The party later merged into the Communist Party of Poland.

References

1931 establishments in Poland
1934 disestablishments in Poland
Banned socialist parties
Defunct socialist parties in Poland
Jewish anti-Zionism in Poland
Jewish political parties
Jewish socialism
Labour parties
Political parties disestablished in 1934
Political parties established in 1931
Political parties of minorities in Poland